Teresa Patricia De Almeida (born 5 April 1988) nicknamed Bá is an Angolan handball player for Petro de Luanda and the Angolan national team.

She represented Angola at the 2013 World Women's Handball Championship in Serbia, the 2016 Summer Olympics, and the 2020 Summer Olympics.

Achievements 
Carpathian Trophy:
Winner: 2019

References

External links
 
 
 

Angolan female handball players
Olympic handball players of Angola
Handball players at the 2016 Summer Olympics
1988 births
Living people
African Games gold medalists for Angola
African Games medalists in handball
Competitors at the 2015 African Games
Competitors at the 2019 African Games
Handball players from Luanda
Handball players at the 2020 Summer Olympics